Ascoli Calcio 1898 F.C., commonly referred to as Ascoli, is an Italian football club based in Ascoli Piceno, Marche. The club was formed in 1898 and currently plays in Serie B.

The team traditionally play in vertical black and white stripes.

History

Founded in 1898 as "Candido Augusto Vecchi", the team changed its name to Ascoli Vigor in 1905, U.S. Ascolana in 1921, and A.S. Ascoli in 1945. In 1955, the team was acquired and saved from bankruptcy by publishing magnate, Cino Del Duca, who merged it with his own team forming "Del Duca Ascoli". The stadium still bears his and his brother's name. In 1959 the team finally returned in Serie C for the first time since before the beginning of World War II. In 1971, under the chairmanship of Costantino Rozzi, who had acquired the team three years earlier, the team changed its name to the current one, finally being known as Ascoli Calcio 1898. From that same year, the team, led by Carlo Mazzone as coach, gained two consecutive promotions, being promoted in Serie B, and then Serie A, for the first time. The team stayed in Serie A for two seasons before being once again relegated to Serie B.

Ascoli returned to Serie A in 1978 and enjoyed a seven-year tenure in the top league, during which time they managed to finish a surprising 4th in 1980 and 6th in 1982. Some of the most notable players under the management of Mazzone and Giovan Battista Fabbri included Adelio Moro, Alessandro Scanziani, Gianfranco Bellotto, Walter Novellino and Andrea Mandorlini, as well as Walter De Vecchi and Giuseppe Greco. After relegation in 1985, the club immediately bounced back and stayed for four more years. Another return to Serie A followed in 1991 but this lasted only one season. After just missing out on promotion for two years running, the club went into decline and were relegated to Serie C1 in 1995. They would remain there for seven seasons, returning to B as Serie C1/B champions in 2002.

In August 2005, after the sentence of relegation from Serie A for both Genoa and Torino respectively due to fraud and financial troubles, Ascoli, who obtained a place in the Serie B promotion playoffs the previous season under coach Marco Giampaolo, were arbitrarily admitted to Serie A as replacements, finishing a highly credible 12th. After the end of the season, Giampaolo, who gained a reputation as one of the finest young Italian coaches, resigned, being replaced by Attilio Tesser for the 2006/2007 season. Tesser, unable to obtain good results in his time with Ascoli, was fired after a 1–0 loss at home to Empoli F.C. in the 11th matchday, and replaced by veteran coach Nedo Sonetti.

Ascoli were the first team to be officially relegated to Serie B for the 2007–08 season after a 1–0 loss to Torino F.C. on 7 May 2007. They ended the season in nineteenth place, one point above last-placed Messina.

German striker Oliver Bierhoff began his experience in Italian football with Ascoli.

Success

Even though from a small city of 50,000 people, Ascoli have been able to punch above their weight. Ascoli have competed 16 seasons in Serie A since 1974, with an incredible 4th and 6th spot finish respectively in the seasons of 1979–80 and 1981–82.

To complement Ascoli's success in Serie A, the club has also achieved 2 Cadetti (Serie B Championships) in 1977–78, and 1985–86. The 1977–78 season yielded a record championship with achieving 61 points (2 points for a victory). Ascoli have competed in Serie B 13 times, with a total of 5 promotion seasons.

Ascoli have made way to Serie B with only two winning seasons in Serie C and C1B. These were in 1971–72, and 2001–02.

Another one of Ascoli's successes is the fact that, for a city of 50,000, their record home attendance has reached 36,500, equivalent to more than 70% of the city's population. In Serie A this was seen against Juventus and the famous season in 1982–83 where Ascoli saved themselves from relegation in the last game of the Serie A season against Cagliari, who were subsequently relegated. However, with stadium restrictions introduced since then, the maximum attendance allowed in the Stadio Cino e Lillo Del Duca is now 21,000–24,000. Nonetheless, when filled, it is still an amazing achievement for such a small city.

Other success were in the Mitropa Cup in 1986–87, the Capodanno Challenge, and the Red Leaf Cup. Ascoli were also finalists in the Anglo-Italia Cup, during Ascoli's last season in Serie B 1994–95, before Ascoli long await in Serie C1 before an emotional return to Serie B for the 2002–03 season.

Under the reign of the great president of Ascoli Calcio – Costantino Rozzi, Ascoli competed 14 of their amazing 16 seasons in Serie A, again another amazing achievement from a club who were once playing in the regional divisions of Marche. Not only this, but Rozzi was able to implement players who were born and raised through the ranks of Ascoli. In the mid to late 1980s saw Giuseppe Iachini, Domenico Agostini, Giuseppe Carillo, and Lorenzo Scarafoni, help Ascoli ensure a return to Serie A and survival the following season. Once Iachini left Agostini, Carillo and Scarafoni, were first team starters as well as Marino Fioravanti and Antonio Aloisi on the bench. Aloisi went on to compete in many season for Ascoli.

Another success is Carlo Mazzone, once at the heart of Del Duca Ascoli's defence playing 9 seasons, led Ascoli for another 10 or so seasons as manager. Mazzone guided Ascoli from Serie C to Serie A, including Ascoli's 6th-placed finish in 1981–82.

Bankruptcy and re-birth

During the 2013–14 Lega Pro Prima Divisione season, the Court of Ascoli Piceno declared the bankruptcy of the club. The court also estimated the residual value of the club assets were €862,000. A new company, Ascoli Picchio F.C. 1898 successfully bid the assets. FIGC also accepted the admission of the new company to the new season without relegation.

In mid-2015 Ascoli, originally runners-up to Teramo in 2014–15 Lega Pro, were declared champions of group B and promoted after Teramo's relegation for involvement in the 2015 Italian football scandal.

On 14 June 2018, club president Francesco Bellini, after first having declared the sale of the club, and having received several offers from prospective owners, accepted the offer of a Roman entrepreneur of Bricofer Group, Massimo Pulcinelli. On 18 July 2018, the club was officially re-branded as Ascoli Calcio 1898 F.C. S.p.A. ahead of the upcoming 2018-19 season.

In the summer of 2021, the North Sixth Group of entrepreneur Matt Rizzetta, based in New York, already present in Italian football with a stake in Campobasso Calcio, acquired a 31% stake in Ascoli Calcio with an option to increase to 51%. The acquisition combined North Sixth Group with Massimo Pulcinelli and Bricofer, the largest homeware retailer in Italy, to build an ambitious project for Ascoli around the world. Following the acquisition, North Sixth Group negotiated an exclusive content rights agreement with Italian Football TV, the largest online content platform for Italian football fans in North America. The agreement provides Ascoli Calcio the only exclusive content partnership of any Italian professional football club.

Supporters

Rivalries

The biggest derby in Marche is between Ascoli and Sambenedettese (Samb, Samba), although the derby with Ancona is better known. The last time the "derby" was played between Ascoli and Sambenedettese in a league season was in 1986. San Benedetto del Tronto is a city in the province of Ascoli Piceno, and only 20 minutes from the city of Ascoli Piceno; the derby is fuelled by intense local pride and rivalry on both sides, and remains passionate despite the length of time since it was last played.

The Ancona derby was the second largest; Ancona and Ascoli have been the two most successful clubs of Marche.  This rivalry stems partly from the fact that Ancona is the capital of Marche, but Ascoli (Asculum) was the capital of ancient Picenun. The battles between the Ascolani and Anconetani have been intense, and there is very much a fight to be La Regina Delle Marche (the queen of Marche).

Fermana is the final significant derby for Ascoli; both teams are located near each other in the Province of Ascoli Piceno, alongside San Benedetto del Tronto. Despite the fact that Fermana have historically been weaker than Ascoli, this still is a derby for the Ascolani and Fermani, with both supporters not wanting to lose this game.

Other rivalries include Livorno, Verona, Pescara and  Inter.

Stadium

Ascoli play their home matches at the 12,461 capacity, Stadio Cino e Lillo Del Duca, located on the outskirts of Ascoli Piceno.

Current squad

Out on loan

Coaching staff
As of 15 August 2022

Honours
 Serie B:
 Winners (2): 1977–78, 1985–86
 Serie C: 
 Winners (3): 1971-72, 2001-02, 2014-15
 Mitropa Cup:
 Winners (1): 1986–87
 Supercoppa di Serie C:
 Winners (1): 2002

Divisional movements

Records
 Highest finish: 4th in Serie A, 1979–80
 League victory: 4–1 v Avellino, 1983–84
 League defeat: 7–0 v Juventus, 1983–84

References

External links
  

 
Football clubs in the Marche
Association football clubs established in 1898
Serie A clubs
Serie B clubs
Serie C clubs
Serie D clubs
1898 establishments in Italy
Football clubs in Italy